Bizarro is a super villain who appears in comic books published by DC Comics.

Bizarro or Bizzarro may also refer to:

Genre 
 Evil twin, the stock character type of which Superman's Bizarro is an example
 Bizarro fiction, since 2005 a genre of underground literature

Music 
 Bizarro (album), a 1989 album by the rock group The Wedding Present

People 
 Bruno Bizarro (born 1979), Portuguese composer
 Carlos Eduardo Bizarro (born 1980), Brazilian footballer
 Gennaro Bizzarro (born 1976), American politician
 Ryan Bizzarro (born 1985), American politician

Physical entertainment 
 Bizarro (roller coaster), rebranded 2009, at Six Flags Great Adventure amusement park

Print media 
 Bizarro (novel), an unfinished novel by Sir Walter Scott begun in 1832 and published posthumously in 2008
 Bizarro (comic strip), since 1985 a daily comic strip by Dan Piraro

Television 
 "Bizarro" (Supergirl), a 2016 episode of the CBS television series Supergirl
 "Bizarro" (Sealab 2021 episode)

See also 

Bazzaro, an Italian surname
Bizarra, a counterpart to DC Comics' Wonder Woman